Gomphidius subroseus is a gilled mushroom found in Europe and North America. It was first described by Calvin Henry Kauffman in 1925. It was once thought to be mycorrhizal with Pinus sylvestris. However, Olson et al. (2002) found it to be more likely to be parasitic on Suillus bovinus, which is mycorrhizal with Pinus sylvestris, Pinus sylvestris or both. It is considered edible but of low quality. As with other species of the genus, removing the glutinous cuticle improves the taste.

See also

 Gomphidius glutinosus

References

External links

Boletales
Edible fungi
Fungi described in 1925
Fungi of North America